WOTB 88.7 FM is a radio station licensed to Pearl River, Louisiana.  The station broadcasts a Contemporary Christian music format and is owned by New Horizon Christian Fellowship. WOTB serves the Greater New Orleans area, the Northshore and the Mississippi Gulf Coast.

References

External links
WOTB's official website

Contemporary Christian radio stations in the United States
Christian radio stations in Louisiana